The Kxʼa  languages, also called Ju–ǂHoan , is a language family established in 2010 linking the ǂʼAmkoe (ǂHoan) language with the ǃKung (Juu) dialect cluster, a relationship that had been suspected for a decade. Along with the Tuu languages and Khoe languages, they are one of three language families indigenous to southern Africa, which are typologically similar due to areal effects.

Languages
ǂʼAmkoe (moribund)
ǃKung (also ǃXun or Ju, formerly Northern Khoisan; a dialect cluster) 

ǂʼAmkoe had previously been lumped in with the Tuu languages, perhaps over confusion with the dialect name ǂHȍȁn, but the only thing they have in common are typological features such as their bilabial clicks. 

Honken & Heine (2010) coined the term Kxʼa for the family as a replacement for the rather inaccessible compound Ju–ǂHoan (easily confused with the Juǀʼhoan language), after the word  'earth, ground', which is shared by the two branches of the family, though also by neighboring languages such as Kwadi.

Reconstruction
Honken & Heine (2010) reconstruct six places of click articulation for Proto-Kxʼa: the five coronal places that occur in Central 	
ǃKung, plus the bilabial clicks of ǂʼAmkoe. They postulate that the ancestral bilabial clicks became dental in ǃKung. However, Starostin (2003) argues that the bilabial clicks are a secondary development in ǂʼAmkoe.
Sands (2014) notes that ǂʼAmkoe bilabial clicks correspond to all clicks places in ǃKung except for palatal. She postulates that these reflect labialized clicks in Proto-Kxʼa: . These became bilabial in ǂʼAmkoe, while the only traces of the labialization in ǃKung are diphthongs. An example, from Proto-Kxʼa *‼ʷ, is 'tail' in ǂHoan , Juǀʼhoan  and Ekoka  (from Proto-Ju *‼xoe: retroflex clicks merged with alveolars in Southern ǃKung, with laterals in Northern ǃKung, and only remained retroflex in Central ǃKung.)

References

 
Language families
Languages of Angola
Languages of Botswana
Languages of Namibia
Endangered languages
Khoisan languages